The Sugarcane Root Aphid (Geoica lucifuga) is an aphid in the superfamily Aphidoidea in the order Hemiptera. It is a true bug and sucks sap from plants.

References 

 http://animaldiversity.org/accounts/Geoica_lucifuga/classification/
 http://www.nbair.res.in/Aphids/Geoica-lucifuga.php
 http://aphid.speciesfile.org/Common/basic/Taxa.aspx?TaxonNameID=1161460

Eriosomatinae
Agricultural pest insects
Insect pests of millets